The 1986 UCI Road World Championships took place on 6 September 1986 in Colorado Springs, United States.

Results

Medal table

External links 
 Men's results
 Women's results
  Results at sportpro.it

References 

 
UCI Road World Championships by year
UCI Road World Championships 1986
Uci Road World Championships, 1986
Uci Road World Championships, 1986